The Communist Party of Canada (Saskatchewan) was a communist party in the Canadian province of Saskatchewan. It was the Saskatchewan section of the Communist Party of Canada.

The party nominated candidates for the Legislative Assembly of Saskatchewan in provincial elections between 1938 and 1986. It ran three popular front candidates under the name "Unity" in 1938, electing two MLAs. They also ran two candidates under the Communist label, who failed to get elected.  After the Communist Party was banned in the early years of World War II, it established the Labor-Progressive Party as its legal front, and ran candidates under that name throughout the 1940s and 1950s.  It reverted to the Communist Party label in 1960.

Electoral history

See also
 List of Canadian political parties
 Politics of Saskatchewan

Saskatchewan
Provincial political parties in Saskatchewan